Selladi tou Appi is a deserted village in the Nicosia District of Cyprus, near the Kokkina exclave but within the area controlled by the Cypriot government. Prior to 1974 the village was exclusively inhabited by Turkish Cypriots.

References

Communities in Nicosia District